William Malcolm Foley (b Coachford 15 August 1854  – d South Dublin 19 October 1944) was Archdeacon of Ardfert from 1915 to 1922.

Foley was educated at Trinity College, Dublin and ordained in 1878. He began his career with curacies at Easky and Tuam. He held incumbencies at Templemichael, County Longford, Askeaton, Doonfeeny and Tralee.

References

Alumni of Trinity College Dublin
Archdeacons of Ardfert
1854 births
1944 deaths
People from County Cork